Tongi Junction Railway Station is a railway station in Bangladesh located in Tongi, Gazipur District. It is a station between Dhirashram and Dhaka Airport railway station. It is about 5 km north of the airport station and about 12 km south of Joydebpur. The station is served by two dual gauge lines and two platforms. Tongi–Bhairab–Akhaura line starts from this station. During the Bishwa Ijtema, it become a hub of communication and additional trains plyed the station.

History 
In 1885 the Dhaka State Railway opened a 144 km railway line from Narayanganj to Mymensingh and the Tongi railway station was established at the same time. In 2011, construction of 3rd and 4th lines to upgrade Dhaka–Tongi two-track railway line to four-track railway line was planned and in 2012 it was approved by Executive Committee of the National Economic Council, but it was not completed even in 2018. Dhaka-Tongi demo train started in 2014.

Criticism 
The area around the Tongi–Joydebpur line, including the Tongi railway station, is known as a haven for drug dealers and robbers.

References

External link 
 

Tongi
Railway stations in Gazipur District
Railway junction stations in Bangladesh
Railway stations opened in 1885
1885 establishments in British India